Ion "Țop" Voinescu (18 April 1929 – 9 March 2018) was a Romanian footballer, who is often considered one of the finest goalkeepers Romania has ever produced.

Voinescu joined his first club, Olympia București, in 1939 just before the start of World War II, aged 10. After four years with Olympia, Voinescu left to join another club from Bucharest, ASPIM, but left again after the war's conclusion in 1945, in order to sign his first professional contract with Carmen București, which was one of the best Romanian football teams during the interbelic period. However, he ended up leaving the club a year later, where he joined Solvay Uioara.

Voinescu left Solvay Uioara a year later to join RATA Târgu Mureș in 1947, where he remained at for a year before leaving in order to return to Bucharest, where he signed for Metalul București. Following a three-year spell with Metalul, Voinescu moved to Steaua București, which was where he remained at before his retirement from professional football in 1963, following an eighteen-year professional career.

Voinescu has won 21 caps for Romania, with his only honor being representing his country at the 1952 Summer Olympics.

It was said that Arsenal and Vasco da Gama were both interested in securing his services during his playing career, but was unable to as it was impossible for Voinescu to leave the country due to the strict restrictions of the communist regime.

Voinenscu worked as a goalkeeper coach for his former club, Steaua București, on multiple occasions after his retirement, before permanently retiring from coaching in the late 1980s.

On 9 March 2018, Voinescu died at the age of 88.

Honours

Club

Steaua București
Romanian League (6):  1951, 1952, 1953, 1956, 1960, 1961
Romanian Cup (5): 1950, 1951, 1952, 1955, 1962

Notes

 The 1950 appearances and goals made for Metalul București are unavailable.

References

External links
 
 

1929 births
2018 deaths
People from Giurgiu County
Romanian footballers
Association football goalkeepers
Romania international footballers
Olympic footballers of Romania
Footballers at the 1952 Summer Olympics
Liga I players
Liga II players
Olympia București players
FC Carmen București players
CS Târgu Mureș players
Faur București players
FC Steaua București players